Loxostegopsis merrickalis, or Merrick's pyralid moth, is a moth in the family Crambidae. It was described by William Barnes and James Halliday McDunnough in 1918. It is found in North America, where it has been recorded from Alabama, California, Florida, Georgia, Illinois, Indiana, Kansas, Maine, Manitoba, Maryland, Massachusetts, Minnesota, New Hampshire, North Carolina, North Dakota, Ohio, Ontario, Pennsylvania, Quebec, South Carolina, Texas, West Virginia and Wisconsin.

References

Moths described in 1918
Spilomelinae